This article is a list of sister cities in the United States state of Texas. Sister cities, known in Europe as town twins, are cities that partner with each other to promote human contact and cultural links, although this partnering is not limited to cities and often includes counties, regions, states, and other sub-national entities.

Many cities works with foreign cities through Sister Cities International, an organization whose goal is to "promote peace through mutual respect, understanding, and cooperation."

A
Abilene
 Río Cuarto, Argentina

Alton
 Cedral, Mexico

Amarillo
 Tuxtla Gutiérrez, Mexico

Arlington
 Bad Königshofen, Germany

Austin

 Adelaide, Australia
 Angers, France
 Antalya, Turkey
 Gwangmyeong, South Korea
 Hackney, England, United Kingdom
 Koblenz, Germany
 Lima, Peru
 Maseru, Lesotho
 Ōita, Japan
 Orlu, Nigeria
 Pune, India
 Saltillo, Mexico
 Taichung, Taiwan
 Xishuangbanna, China

B
Bandera

 Strzelce Opolskie, Poland
 Tysmenytsia, Ukraine

Big Spring

 Hadera, Israel
 San Miguel el Alto, Mexico

Brownsville

 Barranquilla, Colombia
 Matamoros, Mexico

Bryan

 Bastogne, Belgium

 Salamanca, Mexico

C
Carrollton
 Guri, South Korea

Castroville
 Eguisheim, France

Cleburne
 Comonfort, Mexico

College Station

 Bastogne, Belgium

 Salamanca, Mexico

Conroe
 Allende, Mexico

Corpus Christi

 Agen, France
 Keelung, Taiwan
 Yokosuka, Japan

Cuero
 Miguel Alemán, Mexico

D
D'Hanis
 Oberentzen, France

Dallas

 Brno, Czech Republic
 Dijon, France
 Monterrey, Mexico
 Riga, Latvia
 Saratov, Russia
 Sendai, Japan
 Taipei, Taiwan

Denison
 Cognac, France

DeSoto
 Taoyuan, Taiwan

E
East Bernard
 Hvozdná, Czech Republic

El Paso

 Ciudad Juárez, Mexico
 Chihuahua, Mexico
 Guadalajara, Mexico
 Hadera, Israel
 Jerez de la Frontera, Spain
 Querétaro, Mexico
 Torreón, Mexico

F
Farmers Branch

 Bassetlaw, England, United Kingdom
 Garbsen, Germany

Fort Worth

 Bandung, Indonesia
 Budapest, Hungary
 Guiyang, China
 Mbabane, Eswatini
 Nagaoka, Japan
 Nîmes, France
 Reggio Emilia, Italy
 Toluca, Mexico
 Trier, Germany

G
Gainesville
 Sinaia, Romania

Galveston

 Macharaviaya, Spain
 Niigata, Japan
 Stavanger, Norway
 Veracruz, Mexico

Garland
 Taoyuan, Taiwan

Goliad
 Hidalgo, Mexico

Granbury
 Sinan, South Korea

Grand Prairie

 Baden, Austria
 Charlesbourg (Quebec City), Canada
 Guishan (Taoyuan), Taiwan
 Kalush, Ukraine

Grapevine

 Krems an der Donau, Austria
 Parras, Mexico
 West Lothian, Scotland, United Kingdom

H
Houston

 Abu Dhabi, United Arab Emirates
 Baku, Azerbaijan
 Basra, Iraq
 Chiba, Japan
 Grampian, Scotland, United Kingdom
 Guayaquil, Ecuador
 Huelva, Spain
 Istanbul, Turkey
 Karachi, Pakistan
 Leipzig, Germany
 Luanda, Angola
 Nice, France
 Perth, Australia
 Shenzhen, China
 Stavanger, Norway
 Taipei, Taiwan
 Tampico, Mexico
 Tyumen, Russia
 Ulsan, South Korea

I
Irving

 Boulogne-Billancourt, France
 Darkhan, Mongolia
 Espoo, Finland
 León, Mexico
 Marino, Italy
 Merton, England, United Kingdom

K
Killeen

 Osan, South Korea
 San Juan, Puerto Rico

L
La Grange
 Frenštát pod Radhoštěm, Czech Republic

Laredo

 Acámbaro, Mexico
 Campeche, Mexico 
 Cerralvo, Mexico
 Chenzhou, China
 Ciénega de Flores, Mexico
 Ciudad Valles, Mexico
 La Cruz, Costa Rica
 Cuernavaca, Mexico
 General Escobedo, Mexico
 General Terán, Mexico 
 Guadalajara, Mexico
 Guadalupe, Mexico
 Los Herreras, Mexico
 Hutt, New Zealand 
 Jerez, Mexico
 Lampazos de Naranjo, Mexico
 Laredo, Spain
 Lázaro Cárdenas, Mexico
 León, Mexico
 Mexticacán, Mexico
 Monclova, Mexico
 Montemorelos, Mexico
 Murray Bridge, Australia
 Nuevo Laredo, Mexico
 Papantla, Mexico 
 San Antonio de Areco, Argentina
 San Miguel de Allende, Mexico
 Tainan, Taiwan 
 Tepatitlán de Morelos, Mexico
 Tijuana, Mexico
 Tlahualilo, Mexico
 Tonalá, Mexico
 Torreón, Mexico
 Veracruz, Mexico
 Wenzhou, China
 Wuwei, China
 Zixing, China

M
Marshall
 Taipei, Taiwan

McAllen

 Cadereyta Jiménez, Mexico
 Chilpancingo de los Bravo, Mexico
 Ciudad Victoria, Mexico
 García, Mexico
 Guadalupe, Mexico
 Irapuato, Mexico
 Monterrey, Mexico
 Reynosa, Mexico
 San Luis Potosí, Mexico
 Tampico, Mexico
 Taxco de Alarcón, Mexico
 Zihuatanejo de Azueta, Mexico

Mineral Wells
 Mediaș, Romania

Mission

 Almolonga, Guatemala
 Benito Juárez, Mexico
 Fortín, Mexico
 Isla Mujeres, Mexico
 Puerto Vallarta, Mexico
 Río Bravo, Mexico
 Villa del Carbón, Mexico

N
New Braunfels
 Braunfels, Germany

P
Plano

 Hsinchu, Taiwan
 San Pedro Garza García, Mexico

Prairie View

 Aseseeso, Ghana
 Guachené, Colombia
 Manta, Colombia
 Pabellón de Arteaga, Mexico
 Punta Gorda, Belize

R
Rio Bravo
 Santiago, Mexico

Rio Grande City
 Celaya, Mexico

Roma
 Cerralvo, Mexico

Round Rock

 Lake Macquarie, Australia
 Sabinas Hidalgo, Mexico

S
San Antonio

 Chennai, India
 Darmstadt, Germany
 Guadalajara, Mexico
 Gwangju, South Korea
 Kumamoto, Japan
 Monterrey, Mexico
 Kaohsiung, Taiwan
 Las Palmas de Gran Canaria, Spain
 Santa Cruz de Tenerife, Spain
 Windhoek, Namibia
 Wuxi, China

San Elizario

 Allende, Mexico
 Casas Grandes, Mexico
 Ciudad Juárez, Mexico
 Doña Ana, United States
 Guerrero, Mexico
 Hidalgo del Parral, Mexico
 Janos, Mexico
 Jiménez, Mexico
 Mesilla, United States
 Santa Bárbara, Mexico
 Satevó, Mexico
 Valle de Zaragoza, Mexico

Seguin
 San Nicolás de los Garza, Mexico

South Padre Island
 San Pedro Garza García, Mexico

Southlake

 Tome, Japan
 Wuzhong (Suzhou), China

T
Temple
 Aguascalientes, Mexico

Tomball
 Telgte, Germany

Tyler

 Lo Barnechea, Chile
 Jelenia Góra, Poland
 Liberia, Costa Rica
 San Miguel de Allende, Mexico
 Yachiyo, Japan

V
Victoria
 Vitoria-Gasteiz, Spain

Von Ormy
 Marín, Mexico

W
West
 Kunovice, Czech Republic

Wichita Falls
 Fürstenfeldbruck, Germany

References

Texas
Cities in Texas
Sister cities
Populated places in Texas